Spiegelworld is an American theater company known for its current Las Vegas shows: Absinthe, OPM and Atomic Saloon Show.

History
Spiegelworld began by producing shows for a heritage Belgian spiegeltent, made of wood and mirrors, which blurred the lines between cocktail party, live show and night club. Audiences were encouraged to drink from the bars during the show while performers appeared on a central stage only nine feet in diameter. 

Headed by its Impresario Extraordinaire, Ross Mollison, Spiegelworld first opened in the summer of 2006 with the premiere of the show Absinthe on South Street Seaport’s Pier 17 on the East River in New York City. Spiegelworld returned in 2007 with a follow-up season of Absinthe and the premiere of La Vie. The Spiegelworld village was expanded to include a restaurant, hammock garden, outdoor bars, VIP cabanas and a late night music program. In August 2008, Spiegelworld presented a third season on Pier 17 with two spiegeltents and three shows: Absinthe, Gazillionaire’s Late Night Lounge and Desir as well as a live music program and silent disco.

Spiegelworld toured Absinthe to Miami South Beach in 2008, and in January 2009 it created the live entertainment program at the Australian Open tennis grand slam tournament in Melbourne which included a season of Absinthe and a live music program.

Spiegelworld opened an enhanced version of its hit show Absinthe at Caesars Palace Las Vegas on 1 April 2011. The show was initially presented in a 650 seat spiegeltent located on the Roman Plaza. After a six month season, the show was extended and transferred to a custom-built tent on the same location. Still running today, on 16 November 2016, Absinthe was named by Las Vegas Weekly as “the #1 greatest show in Las Vegas history”.

On May 31, 2012, Spiegelworld returned to New York City with its new show Empire and a new site for its spiegeltent on an unused car park in Times Square. Empire commenced a 17 month Australian tour in Sydney on 4 January 2013. In late 2014, the show toured New Zealand and then in 2015 it played seasons in Tokyo, Portland, Toronto and Montreal.

In January 2014, Spiegelworld premiered its new show Vegas Nocturne at Rose.Rabbit.Lie. at The Cosmopolitan of Las Vegas. Presented in three distinct cantos throughout an integrated bar, showroom and restaurant venue, the show ran until July 2014.  Select elements of Vegas Nocturne have since been presented at development showcase seasons at the Slipper Room and House of Yes in New York City and the 2015 Edinburgh Fringe Festival where it was voted Strangest Show.

In 2016, Spiegelworld presented a series of development showcase seasons in Las Vegas and at Joe’s Pub in New York City of Never Sleep Alone, an interactive dating advice comedy featuring the character Dr Alex Schiller.

Absinthe toured Australia in 2015, co-presented by Nine Live. On 24 March 2016, a 3 month Los Angeles season of Absinthe opened at L.A. Live in Downtown Los Angeles.

In early 2018, Spiegelworld began creating a new show for Las Vegas which set out to combine an ensemble of comic characters, unusual variety acts and a retro outer space theme. Opium commenced previews at The Cosmopolitan of Las Vegas on March 13, 2018, and celebrated its 800th performance on October 31, 2019. Opium commenced previews at The Cosmopolitan of Las Vegas on March 13, 2018

Spiegelworld premiered the Wild West themed Atomic Saloon Show at the 2019 Edinburgh Festival Fringe, playing from August 1 to 25 in the Palais du Variete spiegeltent at Assembly George Square Gardens. The show received 5-star reviews in The Times and The Scotsman, and then immediately transferred to its permanent Las Vegas home at the Atomic Saloon inside Grand Canal Shoppes at The Venetian Resort. With performances commencing on September 8, 2019, this marked the first time that Spiegelworld had three shows concurrently playing on the Las Vegas strip.

In January 2023, Spiegelworld purchased the entire town of Nipton in California for $2.5 million. Spiegelworld has stated that Nipton will become their new base of operations and will become a place "where Spiegelworld artists and performers will retreat to dream, create and undertake unfettered artistic experimentation."

Current Productions

Absinthe  
Hosted by The Gazillionaire and inspired by the absinthe-drenched cabarets of late 19th century Europe, Absinthe is an adult-themed cocktail of wild acrobatics, burlesque and vaudeville for a 21st century audience. The show assembles the most talented, sexy and daring artists from across the globe to present breath-taking physical feats, subversive comedy and seductive teases as close to the audience as they can possibly get. The creative team includes director Wayne Harrison, choreographer Lucas Newland and costume designer Angus Strathie.

Opium  
Presented in the 350-seat Opium Theatre at the Cosmopolitan of Las Vegas, the show is set on a spaceship called OPM 73 with a destination of Uranus, the adults-only dinner show features circus-themed performances, including hula hoops, sword swallowing, and juggling, loosely tied together with a comedic storyline.

Atomic Saloon Show  
Hosted by proprietress Madam Boozy Skunkton, Atomic Saloon Show plays in an intimate Wild West themed venue hidden inside the Grand Canal Shoppes at The Venetian Resort Las Vegas. Audiences can lose themselves within a maze of multiple bars, private dining rooms, balconies and booths while Skunkton’s staff and special visitors perform incredible acrobatic, comedy and variety acts on the tiny central stage. The creative team includes UK director Cal McCrystal and set and costume designer takis.

THE HOOK 
Spiegelworld is undertaking a multi-million dollar resurrection of the Warner Theatre as THE HOOK, retaining its original ocean-view façade. Opening June 2023 at Caesars Atlantic City Hotel & Casino and operating every week of the year, THE HOOK will feature a world-premiere live show, an East Coast home for Italian-American-Psychedelic Superfrico restaurant and cocktail bars. As Atlantic City’s first-ever permanent entertainment residency, The Hook live show is directed by British comedy director Cal McCrystal (Atomic Saloon Show, One Man Two Guvnors).

Past Productions

La Vie 
La Vie was a show produced by Spiegelworld which premiered in New York City in its Spiegeltent during the summer of 2007. Spiegelworld commissioned the Montreal based circus company Les Sept Doigts de la Main (The 7 Fingers) to create the show. Acts included apache dance, hand balance on canes, aerial silk and banquine with music from DJ Pocket. La Vie toured internationally until 2013.

Desír 
Desir was a show produced by Spiegelworld which premiered in New York City in its spiegeltent during the summer of 2008.

Gazillionaire's Late Night Lounge 
Gazillionare’s Late Night Lounge was an edgy late night variety show produced by Spiegelworld which premiered in New York City in its spiegeltent during the summer of 2008. The show was hosted by The Gazillionaire and his assistant Penny Pibbets, with house band Fish Circus and special guest acts each evening. The show featured outrageous audience participation and regular segments including What Would You Do For A Dollar?

References

External links 
Spiegelworld Official Website

Circuses